Finger Point may refer to:

Places in Antarctica
 Finger Point (South Sandwich Islands)
 Finger Point (Wilhelm Archipelago)
 Finger Point (Victoria Land)

Other
 The Finger Points, a 1931 American film starring Richard Barthelmess and Fay Wray

See also
 Fingerpointing (disambiguation)